Alemanno is a surname. Notable people with the surname include:

Alberto Alemanno, European law professor
Germán Alemanno, Argentinian footballer striker
Gianni Alemanno, Italian politician
Yohanan Alemanno (1435–1504) Italian philosopher
Pietro Alemanno, Italian-Austrian renaissance painter
Alemanno Adimari (1362–1422), Italian Catholic cardinal and archbishop
 

Ethnonymic surnames